Haplotestis is a genus of worms belonging to the family Otocelididae.

Species:
 Haplotestis curvitubus Dörjes, 1968

References

Acoelomorphs